Blue Ribbon campaign may refer to:

 Blue Ribbon Online Free Speech Campaign—an international, online campaign for freedom of expression on the Internet, orchestrated by the Electronic Frontier Foundation in the mid-1990s through early 2000s
 Blue Ribbon Campaign Against Child Abuse—a US-based, mostly offline ribbon campaign against child abuse in late 1990s
 Blue Ribbon campaign (Fiji)—controversial legislation proposed by the Fijian government to establish a Reconciliation and Unity Commission.

For other uses of blue ribbons, see blue ribbon.

 Blue Ribbon campaign (Myanmar) Academics from Myanmar Technological and Computer Universities protest against the career promotion rules applied by the Ministry of Education, which they claim are opaque and arbitrary.

Ribbon symbolism